New Taipei City Constituency 5 includes all of Shulin, Yingge, and part of Xinzhuang in New Taipei City. The district was formerly known as Taipei County Constituency 5 (2008-2010) and was created in 2008, when all local constituencies of the Legislative Yuan were reorganized to become single-member districts.

Current district
 Shulin
 Yingge
 Xinzhuang: 1 sub-district
 Xisheng: 9 urban villages
 Min'an, Minyou, Minben, Guangming, Guangzheng, Guangrong, Guanghe, Guanghua, Xisheng

Legislators

Election results

 

 
 
 
 
 
 
 

2008 establishments in Taiwan
Constituencies in New Taipei